Høgsfjorden is a fjord in Rogaland county, Norway. It lies in the municipalities of Stavanger, Sandnes, Strand, and Gjesdal. The innermost part of the fjord is located at the village of Frafjord in the municipality of Gjesdal. It flows west to Dirdal and then heads northwards. At the village of Forsand, the Lysefjord branches off to the northeast. The Høgsfjorden continues to the northwest past the islands of Idsal and Idse before emptying into the Horgefjorden (just east of the city of Stavanger) and ultimately into the vast Boknafjorden.

The innermost part of the fjord from Dirdal to Frafjord is also known as the Frafjorden. There is a regular ferry crossing about midway through the fjord connecting the villages of Forsand and Høle.

See also
 List of Norwegian fjords

References

Fjords of Rogaland
Gjesdal
Stavanger
Strand, Norway
Sandnes